D5 motorway is a highway in the Czech Republic. It runs from Prague through Plzeň into Germany. Section between Prague and Beroun is planned to be improved to three lanes in each direction.

Construction
Construction of the D5 began in 1976, with the first 5.8 km long segment opening in 1982. In 1985 another part to Beroun was opened. 29 km of the planned 150 km was already in use in 1989 from Prague to Bavoryně. The biggest problem was with the bypass of Plzeň that was in 1988 planned to be the northern varint. In 1991 it was changed to the southern variant that was supposed to use deep notch thru hill Valík. That started long discussions and court battles that lasted until November 2001 and the construction of the bypass including the tunel under the hill Valík started after that. That was the last part of the highway to be constructed as the rest from Plzeň to the Rozvadov-Waidhaus border crossing was already in use since 1997. The final part was opened on 6 October 2006.

European route
From the Rozvadov-Waidhaus border crossing, it continues as German autobahn A6 west to the border with France. The D5 is part of European route E50. All of D5 is the Czech part of "Via Carolina", the motorway from Nuremberg to Prague.

Tunnel Valík
Very important part of the D5 highway is the tunnel Valík bypassing the city of Pilsen. The technology inside of the tunnel is controlled by a Reliance SCADA system The tunnel was opened on October 6, 2006.

Features

Gallery

References

External links
Official information about the D5 / Valík at ŘSD
Opening of the D5 motorway literally saved the traffic in Plzeň

D05